The 2017 Copa Sudamericana final stages was played from 22 August to 13 December 2017. A total of 16 teams competed in the final stages to decide the champions of the 2017 Copa Sudamericana.

Qualified teams
The 16 winners of the second stage advanced to the round of 16.

Starting from the round of 16, the teams were seeded according to the second stage draw, with each team assigned a "seed" 1–16 corresponding to the tie they won (O1–O16).

Format

Starting from the round of 16, the teams played a single-elimination tournament with the following rules:
Each tie was played on a home-and-away two-legged basis, with the higher-seeded team hosting the second leg (Regulations Article 4.12).
In the round of 16, quarterfinals, and semifinals, if tied on aggregate, the away goals rule would be used. If still tied, extra time would not be played, and the penalty shoot-out would be used to determine the winner (Regulations Article 6.1).
In the finals, if tied on aggregate, the away goals rule would not be used, and 30 minutes of extra time would be played. If still tied after extra time, the penalty shoot-out would be used to determine the winner (Regulations Article 6.2).

Bracket
The bracket starting from the round of 16 was determined as follows:

The bracket was decided based on the second stage draw, which was held on 14 June 2017.

Round of 16
The first legs were played on 22–24 August and 12–14 September, and the second legs were played on 12, 14 and 19–21 September 2017.

|}

Match A

Tied 1–1 on aggregate, Racing won on away goals and advanced to the quarterfinals (Match S1).

Match B

Junior won 3–1 on aggregate and advanced to the quarterfinals (Match S2).

Match C

Flamengo won 4–0 on aggregate and advanced to the quarterfinals (Match S3).

Match D

Nacional won 2–0 on aggregate and advanced to the quarterfinals (Match S4).

Match E

Independiente won 2–1 on aggregate and advanced to the quarterfinals (Match S4).

Match F

Tied 2–2 on aggregate, Fluminense won on away goals and advanced to the quarterfinals (Match S3).

Match G

Sport Recife won 3–2 on aggregate and advanced to the quarterfinals (Match S2).

Match H

Libertad won 2–1 on aggregate and advanced to the quarterfinals (Match S1).

Quarterfinals
The first legs were played on 24–26 October, and the second legs were played on 1 and 2 November 2017.

|}

Match S1

Libertad won 1–0 on aggregate and advanced to the semifinals (Match F1).

Match S2

Junior won 2–0 on aggregate and advanced to the semifinals (Match F2).

Match S3

Flamengo won 4–3 on aggregate and advanced to the semifinals (Match F2).

Match S4

Independiente won 6–1 on aggregate and advanced to the semifinals (Match F1).

Semifinals
The first legs were played on 21 and 23 November, and the second legs will be played on 28 and 30 November 2017.

|}

Match F1

Independiente won 3–2 on aggregate and advanced to the finals.

Match F2

Flamengo won 4–1 on aggregate and advanced to the finals.

Finals

In the finals, if tied on aggregate, the away goals rule would not be used, and 30 minutes of extra time would be played. If still tied after extra time, the penalty shoot-out would be used to determine the winner (Regulations Article 6.2).

The first leg was played on 6 December, and the second leg was played on 13 December 2017.

Independiente won 3–2 on aggregate.

References

External links
CONMEBOL Sudamericana 2017, CONMEBOL.com 

3
August 2017 sports events in South America
September 2017 sports events in South America
October 2017 sports events in South America
November 2017 sports events in South America
December 2017 sports events in South America